Prepoznavanje is a Croatian film directed by Snježana Tribuson. It was released in 1996.

External links
 

1996 films
1990s Croatian-language films
Croatian drama films
1996 drama films